The Politburo and Secretariat of the 8th Congress of the Russian Communist Party (Bolsheviks) were elected by the 1st Plenary Session of the 8th Central Committee in the immediate aftermath of the 8th Congress.

8th Politburo

8th Secretariat

References

Politburo of the Central Committee of the Communist Party of the Soviet Union members
Secretariat of the Central Committee of the Communist Party of the Soviet Union members
Politburo
Politburo
Politburo